The 1910 Haskell Indians football team was an American football team that represented the Haskell Indian Institute (now known as Haskell Indian Nations University) as an independent during the 1910 college football season. In its first and only season under head coach Bill Caldwell, Haskell compiled a 2–7 record and was outscored by a total of 341 to 37.

Four of the team's losses were to programs that now play in Power Five conferences: Kansas State (0–39), Texas (3–63), Baylor (3–52), and Nebraska (0–119).

Schedule

References

Haskell
Haskell Indian Nations Fighting Indians football seasons
Haskell Indians football